PANIC at Multiverse High! is a parody visual novel/otome game in the vein of Hatoful Boyfriend - meant to be a humorous game with bizarre characters, gently mocking the "high school romance" trope.

Gameplay 
The goal of the game is to build up both your stats and your relationship with your club-mates so that you can become close friends with one, ask them to go to Prom with you, and face down Chad, your rival, at last.

The game divides the player's attributes into three - Cool, Nice, Tough - and various decisions throughout the game, such as on the weekends or in classes, influences this rating. While the player is never told the level of attributes precisely, they can ask the mysterious lunch server, the Collector, to give them a relative understanding of how high each one is.

There are six clubs to choose from divided between AM clubs - Sports, Study Hall, and Music - and PM clubs - Art, Drama, and Magic. Choice of club determines the possible friends the player will have access to. (The player is not allowed to switch clubs once they have been chosen) There are three characters in each club - one for each of the attributes the player can raise. Club sessions appear at various points throughout the year, as well as school-based events and holiday festivals. The player can gain points with characters by picking a selection they like in club sessions, or selecting them in events/festivals.

If the player raises an associated attribute high enough and interacts with a character enough, they'll be given an opportunity to invite them over to their house. Once there, the character will ask the player a question: sometimes, this will be harmless, and will result in the player and character becoming friends no matter what - but prouder or more abrasive characters may entirely break off a potential friendship if the player gives the wrong response.

Development and release 
The game was announced in PC Gamer a day before its release on Steam, along with details on the second game it was meant to raise funds for - PANIC in the Multiverse!. A widescreen update later on also released the game on Google Play, making it available on Android systems like phones and tablets.

The music was composed by Lena "Raine" Chappelle.

PANIC in the Multiverse! 

PANIC in the Multiverse! is meant to be the second game in DoubleBear Productions PANIC series.

The gameplay has been described as "tug-of-war" style and influenced by JRPG combat, and involves gathering a selection of heroes with unique skills to fight back against the game's main villain, "King Sha'art".

No release date has yet been given for the project.

References

External links 
 
 PANIC at Multiverse High! - Steam Page
 - Google Play listing
 official soundtrack by Lena Raine

2016 video games
Android (operating system) games
Indie video games
Video games developed in the United States
Video games scored by Lena Raine
Windows games
Otome games
Visual novels
Ren'Py games